Daniel Strickner (born 16 April 1997) is an Austrian football player. He plays for SPG Silz/Mötz.

Club career
He made his Austrian Football First League debut for WSG Wattens on 4 August 2017 in a game against Kapfenberger SV.

SPG Silz/Mötz

References

External links
 
 Daniel Strickner at ÖFB

1997 births
Living people
Austrian footballers
WSG Tirol players
2. Liga (Austria) players
Association football midfielders